Eight Ball is a 1992 Australian film directed by Ray Argall.

Plot
A young architect, Charlie, meets Russell, who has just got out of prison.

Production
It was financed by the FFC and Film Victoria and was shot from 13 May to 28 June 1991. Argall says making the film was unsatisfactory:
 I spent too much time and put too much energy into making everybody else happy and doing the right thing by everybody else instead of doing the right thing by myself. There's a point where you need to actually focus on what is there. There were many elements of the storytelling that I could have focused on and developed, rather than just dropping and replacing them with something new, and it may have helped. The romance between the main character and his girlfriend - there was a great desire on the part of quite a few of the people who were financing it, to develop this and to make it a strong element. It's not a real strength of mine, and I did all that, but at the expense of other elements that were probably more in tune with the story that I originally had in mind. I developed those things but in the editing room we probably cut it down to what it was in the original script.

References

External links
 
 Eight Ball at Oz Movies

1992 films
Australian drama films
1990s English-language films
1990s Australian films